Agua Fria, Agua Fría, or Água Fria (all meaning "cold water") may refer to:

Brazil
Água Fria de Goiás, a municipality in northern Goiás state
Água Fria, a municipality in the state of Bahia

Panama
Agua Fría, Panama (Darién Province)

United States
Agua Fria, New Mexico, a suburb of Santa Fe
Agua Fria, California, a ghost town
In Arizona:
Agua Fria, Arizona
Agua Fria National Monument, Arizona
Agua Fria Freeway, a part of Loop 101 in Metropolitan Phoenix, Arizona
Agua Fria River